Live in the Classic City II is the eighth live album released by the Athens, GA based band Widespread Panic. The album was recorded during a three-night run that took place April 1–3, 2000 at The Classic Center in Athens, GA. It was released on September 28, 2010.

Track listing

Disc one
"Travelin' Light" (J.J. Cale) – 6:16
"Machine" (Widespread Panic) – 3:15
"Barstools and Dreamers" (Widespread Panic) – 11:45
"This Part of Town" (Widespread Panic) – 5:17
"Sleeping Man" (Vic Chesnutt) – 6:37
"Radio Child" (Widespread Panic) – 5:32
"Imitation Leather Shoes" (Widespread Panic) – 4:48

Disc two
"Disco" (Widespread Panic) – 4:47
"Rebirtha" (Widespread Panic) – 12:43
"Greta" (Widespread Panic) – 10:22
"E on a G" (Widespread Panic) – 6:18
"You'll Be Fine" (Widespread Panic) – 3:35
"Big Wooly Mammoth" (Widespread Panic) – 6:15
"Fishwater" (Widespread Panic) – 11:24
"Success Yourself" (Daniel Hutchens) – 5:37
"End of the Show" (Daniel Hutchens & Eric Carter) – 6:44

Personnel
Widespread Panic
John Bell – guitar, vocals
John Hermann – keyboards, vocals
Michael Houser – guitar
Todd Nance – drums, vocals
Domingo S. Ortiz – percussion
Dave Schools – bass

Guest Performers
John Keane – pedal steel
Dr. Arvin Scott – percussion
Anne Richmond Boston – vocals
Daniel Hutchens – vocals
Eric Carter – guitar
Mike Mills – keyboard
Wade Hester - Guitar
Production
John Keane – producer, mixing
Billy Field – engineer
Ken Love – mastering
Danny Friedman – assistant engineer
Brad Blettenberg – assistant engineer
Chris Bilheimer- art direction
Michael Sherhan- photography
Eve Kakassy- photography
Ellie MacKnight – package coordinator

Charts

References

External links
Widespread Panic website
Everyday Companion
[ All Music entry]

2010 live albums
Widespread Panic live albums
Albums produced by John Keane (record producer)